Koblenz railway station is a railway station in the Swiss canton of Aargau and municipality of Koblenz. The station is located at junction of the Turgi to Waldshut railway line with the Winterthur to Koblenz line and the freight only Koblenz to Stein-Säckingen line. 

Koblenz station should not be confused with Koblenz Dorf station, which is situated rather closer to the centre of Koblenz.

Because Koblenz is situated between the Aar and Rhine rivers at their confluence, the station is adjacent to two major railway bridges. The Waldshut–Koblenz Rhine railway bridge carries the Turgi to Waldshut line across the Rhine into Germany, whilst the Koblenz Aar railway bridge carries the line to Stein Säckingen over the river Aar.

History
The station was opened on 1 August 1859.

The station underwent modernization and improvement works in 2013 during which an underpass was built enabling passengers to reach platforms without having to cross the railway tracks. Signals were also automated at that time and the station has since then no longer been staffed.

Customs
Koblenz is, for customs purposes, a border station for passengers arriving from Germany. Customs checks may be performed aboard trains and in Koblenz station by Swiss officials. Systematic passport controls were abolished when Switzerland joined the Schengen Area in 2008.

Services
 the following services stop at Koblenz:

References

External links

Koblenz
Koblenz